Because the NTSC color television standard relies on the absolute phase of the color information, color errors occur when the phase of the video signal is altered between source and receiver, or due to  non linearities in electronics. To correct for phase errors, a tint control is provided on NTSC television sets, which allows the user to manually adjust the phase relationship between the color information in the video and the reference for decoding the color information, known as the "color burst", so that correct colors may be displayed.

The tint control is normally set by sight to create satisfactory skin tones in a picture. The range of adjustment typically allows these colors to be adjusted from a green to a magenta tint. Television sets produced in recent decades typically include a (sometimes non-defeatable) distortion of the color decoding spectrum, to minimize the visual effects of phase error and lessen the need to adjust the tint control.

On broadcast equipment, such as timebase correctors and studio monitors, this control is typically marked "phase," as it adjusts the phase of the color signal with respect to the color burst signal.

Since the problem of phase errors in the real world became well known after the introduction of NTSC, the later PAL and SECAM color television standards attempted to correct for them. PAL uses the same color modulation scheme as NTSC but averages the received color information over adjacent scan lines, resulting in reduced color detail but canceling out small to moderate phase errors. (Severe phase errors result in picture grain and loss of color saturation in the PAL scheme.) SECAM uses a different modulation scheme that does not rely on the phase of the color signal. Because of this the amplitude of the color signal (color saturation) is unaffected as well. Because SECAM only broadcasts half the color information on each line, the color resolution is halved just like in the PAL system. Most TV sets designed for these later standards lack tint controls, as PAL and SECAM are not supposed to experience the problems a tint control would correct. (This leaves the viewer unable to correct for color errors originating at the transmission site, however.) Multistandard sets have tint controls for NTSC viewing, but the controls are inoperative when watching PAL or SECAM signals.

References 

Television technology